is a junction passenger railway station in Kawasaki-ku, Kawasaki, Kanagawa Prefecture, Japan, operated by the East Japan Railway Company (JR East) with a freight depot operated by the Japan Freight Railway Company (JR Freight)

Lines

Station layout
Hama-Kawasaki Station consists of two separate structures for the Tsurumi Line and Nambu Branch Line, located on either side of a street. The Nambu Branch Line station consists of an island platform with only the terminating track 2 on the west side used by Nambu Branch Line trains. Track 1 is a freight-only line, and the platform edge is fenced off on this side. The Tsurumi Line station also consists of an island platform, serving two tracks.

Platforms

History

Hama-Kawasaki Station opened on 1 May 1918, as a dedicated freight depot on the Tokaido Main Line. The privately held  also began operations to Hama-Kawasaki from 10 March 1926. On 14 March 1929, the Tsurumi Rinkō Railway transferred its freight depot to the adjacent . On 25 March 1930, the Nambu Railway began freight operations to Shin-Hamakawasaki Station and Hama-Kawasaki Station. Shin-Hamakawasaki began accepting passenger traffic from 10 April 1930, as did Watarida Station on 28 October of the same year.

The Tsurumi Rinkō Railway was nationalized into the Japanese Government Railways on July 1, 1943. at which time Watarida Station and Hama-Kawasaki Station were joined into a single station. The Nambu Line was likewise nationalized on April 1, 1944, and Shin-Hamakawasaki Station was merged into Hama-Kawasaki Station.

The station has been unstaffed since 1 March 1971. Upon the privatization of Japanese National Railways (JNR) on 1 April 1987, the station has been operated by JR East and JR Freight.

Passenger statistics
In fiscal 2008, the station was used by an average of 2,606 passengers daily (boarding passengers only). The passenger figures for previous years are as shown below.

Surrounding area
JFE Steel East Japan Works 
Kawasaki City Hall Tajima Branch
Kawasaki City Watarida Elementary School
Kawasaki Municipal Rinko Junior High School
Kawasaki City Tajima School for the Disabled

See also
 List of railway stations in Japan

References

External links

 JR East station information 

Stations of East Japan Railway Company
Stations of Japan Freight Railway Company
Railway stations in Kanagawa Prefecture
Railway stations in Japan opened in 1918
Railway stations in Kawasaki, Kanagawa